Elections to Omagh District Council were held on 7 June 2001 on the same day as the other Northern Irish local government elections. The election used three district electoral areas to elect a total of 21 councillors.

Election results

Note: "Votes" are the first preference votes.

Districts summary

|- class="unsortable" align="centre"
!rowspan=2 align="left"|Ward
! % 
!Cllrs
! % 
!Cllrs
! %
!Cllrs
! %
!Cllrs
! % 
!Cllrs
!rowspan=2|TotalCllrs
|- class="unsortable" align="center"
!colspan=2 bgcolor="" | Sinn Féin
!colspan=2 bgcolor="" | SDLP
!colspan=2 bgcolor="" | UUP
!colspan=2 bgcolor="" | DUP
!colspan=2 bgcolor="white"| Others
|-
|align="left"|Mid Tyrone
|bgcolor="#008800"|56.5
|bgcolor="#008800"|4
|20.7
|2
|12.5
|1
|10.3
|0
|0.0
|0
|7
|-
|align="left"|Omagh Town
|bgcolor="#008800"|23.6
|bgcolor="#008800"|1
|15.8
|2
|23.2
|1
|22.8
|1
|14.6
|2
|7
|-
|align="left"|West Tyrone
|bgcolor="#008800"|38.3
|bgcolor="#008800"|3
|22.6
|2
|19.8
|1
|14.8
|1
|4.5
|0
|7
|-
|- class="unsortable" class="sortbottom" style="background:#C9C9C9"
|align="left"| Total
|40.4
|8
|22.0
|6
|15.6
|3
|13.5
|2
|8.5
|2
|21
|-
|}

District results

Mid Tyrone

1997: 3 x Sinn Féin, 2 x SDLP, 1 x UUP
2001: 4 x Sinn Féin, 2 x SDLP, 1 x UUP, 1 x DUP
1997-2001 Change: Sinn Féin gain from DUP

Omagh Town

1997: 2 x SDLP, 1 x Sinn Féin, 1 x DUP, 1 x UUP, 1 x Alliance, 1 x Labour Coalition
2001: 2 x SDLP, 2 x Independent, 1 x Sinn Féin, 1 x DUP, 1 x UUP
1997-2001 Change: Independents (two seats) leave SDLP and Labour Coalition, SDLP gain from Alliance

West Tyrone

1997: 2 x Sinn Féin, 2 x SDLP, 2 x UUP, 1 x DUP
2001: 3 x Sinn Féin, 2 x SDLP, 1 x DUP, 1 x UUP
1997-2001 Change: Sinn Féin gain from UUP

References

Omagh District Council elections
Omagh